Makumbusho is an administrative ward in the Kinondoni district of the Dar es Salaam Region of Tanzania. In 2016 the Tanzania National Bureau of Statistics report there were 85,268 people in the ward, from 68,093 in 2012.

It is located a few kilometres north west of the centre of Dar es Salaam, just south of the Bagamoyo Road. Makumbusho hosts one of Dar es Salaam's numerous markets, but is currently reported to be declining due to lack of efficient connections with the city.

Makumbusho houses the Makumbusho Village Museum (or simply Village Museum ; in Swahili "Kijiji cha Makumbusho"), an outdoor museum exhibiting 16 traditional houses of the main ethnic groups of Tanzania, and the typical crops of each of these ethnic groups. Founded in 1996, it is one of a consortium of five museums collectively known as the National Museum of Tanzania. The museum is also associated with a cultural center (Makumbusho Cultural Centre), which organizes performances of traditional dances and traditional food tastings Tanzania. Local artists operate in the museum, and artisans display and sell their creations.

References

Kinondoni District
Wards of Dar es Salaam Region